8:08 Er Bongaon Local is a Bengali social drama film directed by Debaditya Bandyopadhyay and produced by Torun Raut. This film was released on 27 April 2012 under the banner of Unimass Entertainment. This movie was based on an infamous incident of eve teasing and murder at Barasat, North 24 Parganas in 2011.

Plot
Ananta Das is a middle-class common man who commutes daily on the 8:08 A.M. Bongaon Local to Sealdah for his office job. During his regular journey towards Kolkata, he realizes that people have stopped protesting against any form of injustice due to fear or depression, and he, too, has become spineless like others. However, an incident shocks him and changes his mindset completely. One day, a student is killed by goons for protesting against the eve-teasing of his elder sister. At first, Ananta refrains from taking action, but later he bursts out with anger and protests against every wrong deed in his surroundings.

Cast
 Tapas Paul as Ananta Das
 Manoj Mitra as Ananta's Father
 Swastika Mukherjee as Shreyashi, a news reporter
 Raghubir Yadav as Rickshaw puller
 Haradhan Bandopadhyay as Doctor
 Rajesh Sharma as Shishir, a Police officer
 Kanchana Moitra as Sima
 Sonali Chowdhury
 Anamika Saha as a Brothel owner (guest appearance)
 Anushree Das as Ananta's Wife
 Ratan Sarkhel 
 Bhaskar Banerjee as Ananta's Office Colleague
 Krishnokishore Mukherjee as a Police officer
 Diganta Bagchi as Rajat, News Anchor
 Shamik Sinha as Raju Dutta, a local goon

References

External links
 

2012 films
Bengali-language Indian films
2010s Bengali-language films
Indian drama films
Indian films based on actual events
Social realism in film
Films about social issues in India
2012 drama films